Einfallsgraben is a small river of Bavaria, Germany. After a course of about 2 km it enters a sink near Alzenau.

See also
List of rivers of Bavaria

Rivers of Bavaria
Rivers of the Spessart
Endorheic basins of Europe
Rivers of Germany